Hellraiser is the fifteenth studio album by the Swiss hard rock band Krokus. It marks 30 years since the release of their first album, Krokus of 1976. It is also their first album on the German record label AFM Records. Armand "Mandy" Meyer featured as lead guitarist, replacing Fernando von Arb. The album was also released in a DigiPack format with a bonus track, "Walking in the Spirit".

Hellraiser peaked at No. 200 on the Billboard Top 200 album chart, the first to do so since 1988's Heart Attack. It peaked at No. 2 in the Swiss Album chart and was certified Gold in Switzerland.

Track listing 
 "Hellraiser" (Marc Storace) – 3:37 
 "Too Wired to Sleep" (Tony Castell, Storace) – 2:44 
 "Hangman" (Dominique Favez, Storace) – 4:06 
 "Angel of My Dreams" (Castell, Storace) – 3:47 
 "Fight On" (Mandy Meyer, Storace) – 5:02 
 "So Long" (Meyer, Storace) – 4:30 
 "Spirit of the Night" (Meyer, Storace) – 4:01 
 "Midnite Fantasy" (Storace) – 4:10 
 "No Risk No Gain" (Favez, Storace) – 3:52 
 "Turnin' Inside Out" (Meyer, Storace) – 3:51
 "Take My Love" (Favez, Storace) – 4:57 
 "Justice" (Charly Preissel, Storace) – 3:46 
 "Love Will Survive" (Favez, Castell, Storace) – 3:37 
 "Rocks Off!" (Castell, Storace) – 3:54

Japanese edition bonus track
"Hellraiser" (live) – 3:46

Digipak edition bonus track
"Walking in the Spirit" – 2:38

Personnel
Band members
Marc Storace – vocals, vocal producer
Mandy Meyer – lead guitar
Dominique Favez – rhythm guitar
Tony Castell – bass
Stefan Schwarzmann – drums, percussion
Dennis Ward – keyboards, producer, engineer, mixing

Production
Jürgen Lusky – mastering

Charts

Certifications

References

Krokus (band) albums
2006 albums
AFM Records albums
Albums produced by Dennis Ward (musician)